Ann Leahy (born 8 August 1971) is an Australian politician. She has been the Liberal National Party member for Warrego in the Queensland Legislative Assembly since 2015.

Prior to her pre-selection for Warrego by the Liberal National Party, Leahy had been the electorate office for her predecessor, Howard Hobbs. In 1998, Hobbs had resigned from the Borbidge government after his wife alleged that he was having an affair with a staffer, who was later revealed to have been Leahy.

References

1971 births
Living people
Members of the Queensland Legislative Assembly
Liberal National Party of Queensland politicians
University of Southern Queensland alumni
21st-century Australian politicians
Women members of the Queensland Legislative Assembly
21st-century Australian women politicians